Margaret River Senior High School is a comprehensive public co-educational high day school, located in Margaret River, a regional centre  south of Perth, Western Australia.

History 

In 1962 the primary school split from the high school and the number of enrolments fell to 264 students from Year 8 to Year 10. The school farm commenced operation in 1956.
The school became a senior high school in 1995 offering a range or subjects to Year 11 and 12 students.

Enrolments at the school have been reasonably steady with 632 students enrolled in 2007, 635 in 2008, 612 in 2009, 545 in 2010, 542 in 2011 and 576 in 2012. By 2019 enrolments had increased to 1,026 students.

See also

List of schools in rural Western Australia

References

External links
 

Public high schools in Western Australia
Margaret River, Western Australia
Educational institutions established in 1952
1952 establishments in Australia